Melco Resorts & Entertainment Limited is a developer, owner and operator of integrated resorts with entertainment and casino gaming facilities in Asia and Europe. Based in Hong Kong, the company is listed on the NASDAQ. Originally known as Melco Crown Entertainment (Melco Crown or MPEL), Melco Resorts was founded in 2004 as a joint venture between Melco International and Crown Limited. Melco Crown became Melco Resorts & Entertainment in May 2017 and currently operates as a subsidiary of Melco International. Melco Resorts owns a number of integrated casino resorts, having launched Altira Macau in 2007, City of Dreams Macau in 2009, City of Dreams Manila in 2015, and Studio City Macau in 2015. It also operates the Mocha Clubs slot machine brand and is in the process of constructing the City of Dreams Mediterranean resort in Cyprus, which will be the largest casino-resort in Europe.

History

Founding as Melco Crown Entertainment (2004-2015)
In 2004, Melco International Development Limited partnered with James Packer's Australian casino company Crown Limited, creating the joint venture Melco Crown Entertainment Limited to invest in gaming ventures in Macau. Melco International's chief executive, Lawrence Ho, was appointed CEO and executive director of Melco Crown Entertainment in December 2004, with both Ho and Packer appointed co-chairmen. In March 2006, Melco Crown spent US$900 million to purchase the last of Macau's six gaming licenses from Wynn Resorts. The license allowed Melco Crown to "operate an unlimited number of casinos, tables and machines in Macau until June 2022," and the company began developing its first casino. Melco Crown listed on the NASDAQ in December 2006 and launched Altira Macau in July 2007, which was built for $1.45 billion. 

Crown Limited's interest in Melco Crown was around 36% by June 2009, and in that year Melco Crown opened its flagship $2.4 billion casino resort City of Dreams Macau in Cotai. Melco Crown listed its shares on the Hong Kong Stock Exchange at the end of 2011. Also in 2011, Melco Crown acquired a 60% interest in Studio City Macau, a large-scale integrated resort project in Cotai. Designed with a Hollywood theme, the casino resort opened in October 2015 with a cost $3.2 billion. In its first project outside of Macau, in 2012 Melco Crown began partnering with SM Investments on the $1 billion casino resort City of Dreams Manila in the Philippines,  in which Melco Crown was expected to invest up to $580 million. The casino resort opened in 2015.

Melco Resorts & Entertainment (2016-2020)
Melco International became the majority shareholder of Melco Crown in May 2016. Crown Limited subsequently "suffered debts from ill-timed investments," according to the South China Morning Post, giving Melco International "the chance to buy up Packer’s shares." After developing four integrated resorts together, Melco International ended its partnership with Crown Resorts in May 2017 and purchased stake in Crown for $1.16 billion, with Melco Crown rebranded as Melco Resorts & Entertainment. Ho officially became COO, CEO, and chairman of Melco Resorts in April 2017, overseeing three resorts in Macau, eight Mocha Clubs, the resort in the Philippines, and the development in Cyprus. Melco's Mocha Clubs, opened in 2003 by Melco International in Macau, earlier had helped introduce "cafe-style slot-machine parlors" to Macau. 

Melco Resorts announced in December 2017 that its Crown Towers hotels at City of Dreams in Macau and Manila would be rebranded as Nüwa. In June 2018, Melco Resorts & Entertainment opened Morpheus, a $1.1 billion hotel tower designed by Zaha Hadid  for City of Dreams Macau. In July 2018, Melco Resorts opened the first esports stadium in Macau at Studio City. In the same year, Melco Resorts also won a license to build the largest casino-resort in Europe, securing a 30-year license for an integrated resort in Limassol, Cyprus with 15 years of exclusivity.  Melco Resorts purchased a controlling stake in the Cyprus project in June 2019.  Also that year, Melco Resorts announced that it was purchasing a stake in Crown Resorts from James Packer, with further stake increases to take place as it received regulatory approval. Melco Resorts sold the entirety of its stake in Crown Resorts to Blackstone Group Inc. in May 2020.

After new legislation legalized casinos in Japan in 2018, three integrated resort licenses were made available to bidders. new legislation legalized casinos in Japan in 2018, Melco Resorts submitted preliminary documents to the Osaka government to bid there for an integrated resort and announced it would be willing to invest as much as $10 billion in such a project. Describing project features such as an esports stadium, Melco Resorts also asserted that the project would bring tens of thousands of foreign workers to Japan. In August 2019, Yokohama became the second Japanese city besides Osaka to begin accepting bids, announcing its candidate site as Yamashita Pier. Adopting a "Yokohama-First" policy and stating that the location had become their "main focus," Melco Resorts dropped its bid in Osaka in September 2019 and began pitching "the world's biggest integrated resort" in Yokohama.  Also in September 2019, Melco Resorts began constructing an office in Yokohama.

In August 2019, Melco Resorts became the official sponsor of Manchester City in Japan, while also sponsoring its sister club Yokohama F. Marinos. Melco Resorts announced that it has appointed tennis player Naomi Osaka to serve as its brand ambassador in October 2019, and that she was also director of sports for Melco's Japanese resorts. On October 29, Melco Resorts announced that it has invested $248 million in a fund to back hospitality projects in Japan. Independent of the integrated resort bid in Yokohama, The Melco Creative Exchange Fund was created specifically for non-gaming hotel projects.

Properties
Studio City Macau (60% ownership)
City of Dreams
City of Dreams Manila
Altira Macau
Morpheus Macau
Mocha Clubs
Cyprus Casinos

References

External links 
 

Companies of Hong Kong
Companies of Macau
Gambling companies of Macau
Companies listed on the Nasdaq
Entertainment companies established in 2017
2017 establishments in Hong Kong
2006 initial public offerings